Macromedia, Inc., was an American graphics, multimedia, and web development software company (1992–2005) headquartered in San Francisco, California, that made products such as Flash and Dreamweaver. It was purchased by its rival Adobe Systems on December 3, 2005.

History
Macromedia originated in the 1992 merger of Authorware Inc. (makers of Authorware) and MacroMind–Paracomp (makers of Macromind Director).

Director, an interactive multimedia-authoring tool used to make presentations, animations, CD-ROMs and information kiosks, served as Macromedia's flagship product until the mid-1990s. Authorware was Macromedia's principal product in the interactive learning market. As the Internet moved from a university research medium to a commercial network, Macromedia began working to web-enable its existing tools and develop new products like Dreamweaver. Macromedia created Shockwave, a Director-viewer plugin for web browsers. The first multimedia playback in Netscape's browser was a Director plug-in. Macromedia licensed Sun's Java Programming Language in October 1995. By 2002, Macromedia produced more than 20 products and had 30 offices in 13 countries.

Acquisitions
In January 1995, Macromedia acquired Altsys Corporation after Adobe Systems announced a merger with Altsys' business partner, the Aldus Corporation. Altsys was the developer of the vector-drawing program FreeHand, which had been licensed by Aldus for marketing and sales. Because of the similarities with Adobe Illustrator, the Federal Trade Commission issued a complaint in October 1994 ordering a divestiture of FreeHand back to Altsys. With Macromedia's acquisition of Altsys, it received FreeHand thus expanding its product line of multimedia graphics software to include illustration and design graphics software. FreeHand's vector graphics rendering engine and other software components within the program would prove useful to Macromedia in the development of Fireworks.

In March 1996, Macromedia acquired iBand Software, makers of the Backstage HTML authoring tool and application server. Macromedia developed a new HTML-authoring tool, Dreamweaver, around portions of the Backstage codebase and released the first version in 1997. At the time, most professional web authors preferred to code HTML by hand using text editors because they wanted full control over the source. Dreamweaver addressed this with its "Roundtrip HTML" feature, which attempted to preserve the fidelity of hand-edited source code during visual edits, allowing users to work back and forth between visual and code editing. Over the next few years Dreamweaver became widely adopted among professional web authors, though many still preferred to hand-code, and Microsoft FrontPage remained a strong competitor among amateur and business users.

Macromedia acquired FutureWave Software, makers of FutureSplash Animator, in November 1996. FutureSplash Animator was an animation tool originally developed for pen-based computing devices. Because of the small size of the FutureSplash Viewer application, it was particularly suited for download over the Internet, where most users, at the time, had low-bandwidth connections.  Macromedia renamed Splash to Macromedia Flash, and following the lead of Netscape, distributed the Flash Player as a free browser plugin in order to quickly gain market share. As of 2005, more computers worldwide had the Flash Player installed than any other Web media format, including Java, QuickTime, RealNetworks, and Windows Media Player. As Flash matured, Macromedia's focus shifted from marketing it as a graphics and media tool to promoting it as a Web application platform, adding scripting and data access capabilities to the player while attempting to retain its small footprint.

In December 1999, Macromedia acquired traffic analysis software company Andromedia Corporation. Web development company Allaire was acquired in 2001 and Macromedia added several popular servers and Web developments tools to its portfolio, including ColdFusion, a web application server based on the CFML language, JRun, a Java EE application server, and HomeSite, an HTML code editor that was also bundled with Dreamweaver.

In 2003, Macromedia acquired the web conferencing company Presedia and continued to develop and enhance their Flash-based online collaboration and presentation product offering under the brand Breeze. Later that year, Macromedia also acquired help authoring software company eHelp Corporation, whose products included RoboHelp and RoboDemo (now Adobe Captivate).

Purchase

On April 18, 2005, Adobe Systems announced an agreement to acquire Macromedia in a stock swap valued at approximately $3.4 billion on the last trading day before the announcement.  The acquisition took place on December 3, 2005, and Adobe integrated the company's operations, networks, and customer care organizations shortly thereafter.

Lawsuits
On August 22, 1997, stockholders filed a class-action lawsuit in the California Superior Court in San Francisco, accusing Macromedia of misleading stockholders on the company's product success and financial health. A similar suit had been filed a month earlier. The class-action suit was dismissed by a federal judge on May 19, 1998.

On August 10, 2000, Adobe claimed that Macromedia violated two of its patents on tabbed palettes. Macromedia countered with a claim that Adobe infringed on Macromedia's patents for a draw-based editor for Web pages and a hierarchical structure editor for Web sites. In July 2002, Adobe and Macromedia reached an agreement that settled all claims in this series of patent suits. Eventually, Adobe acquired Macromedia 3 years later.

Leadership 

1992: Bud Colligan became co-founder and CEO of Macromedia, a position he held until 1997; he served as board chairman 1992-1998.
1994: Altsys Corp and CEO James Von Ehr became a Macromedia vice-president, a position he held until 1997.
1996: Robert K. Burgess was hired as President of Macromedia, and became CEO in 1997, a position he held until 2005; he served as Board Chairman 1998-2005, a position he held when the company was acquired by Adobe.
1997: Betsey Nelson became Chief Financial Officer, a position she held until Macromedia was acquired by Adobe.
2004: Stephen Elop became Chief Operating Officer.
2005: Stephen Elop had been CEO for three months when Macromedia announced it would be acquired by Adobe.

Products

See also 

 Macromedia software

References

External links
 Adobe - Stories
 Adobe Feeds Weblogs

Adobe Inc.
Defunct software companies of the United States
Software companies based in the San Francisco Bay Area
Companies based in San Francisco
Software companies established in 1992
Software companies disestablished in 2005
1992 establishments in California
2005 disestablishments in California
Defunct companies based in the San Francisco Bay Area
2005 mergers and acquisitions
Companies formerly listed on the Nasdaq